Statistics of Nadeshiko.League in the 2008 season. Nippon TV Beleza won the championship.

Division 1

Result

League awards

Best player

Top scorers

Best eleven

Best young player

Division 2

Result 

 Best Player: Yuka Shimizu, JEF United Chiba Ladies

Promotion/relegation series

Division 1 promotion/relegation series 

 Speranza FC Takatsuki Promoted for Division 1 in 2009 Season.
 Iga FC Kunoichi Relegated to Division 2 in 2009 Season.

See also 
 Empress's Cup

External links 
  Nadeshiko League Official Site
 Season at soccerway.com

Nadeshiko League seasons
1
L
Japan
Japan